The Miles M.1 Satyr was a 1930s British single-seat aerobatic biplane designed by F.G. Miles and built for him by George Parnall and Company.

Design and development
The Satyr  was designed in 1932 by F.G. Miles. It was a wooden single-seat aerobatic biplane powered by a 75 hp Pobjoy R engine. The aircraft (registered G-ABVG) first flew in August 1932. Although the aircraft flew well Miles decided to concentrate on monoplane designs and only one was built. The only Satyr crashed in September 1936.

Specifications (M.1)

See also

References

Notes

Bibliography

 Amos, Peter. and Brown, Don Lambert. Miles Aircraft Since 1925. London: Putnam Aeronautical, 2000. .  
 
 The Illustrated Encyclopedia of Aircraft (Part Work 1982-1985). Orbis Publishing.
 

1930s British sport aircraft
Satyr
Aerobatic aircraft
Single-engined tractor aircraft
Biplanes
Aircraft first flown in 1932